Crann Úll is the fifth album by Irish folk group Clannad released in 1980. It is also the first Clannad album to feature younger sister Eithne Ní Bhraonáin (later known as Enya). She appears as supporting vocalist on the track "Gathering Mushrooms".
The name of the album (and song on track 6) translates as "Apple Tree".

The album was remastered and reissued on 7 August 2020 in both compact disc and vinyl formats.

Track listing
 "Ar a Ghabháil 'n a 'Chuain Damh" – 3:28
 "The Last Rose of Summer" – 4:17
 "Crúiscín Lán" – 2:34
 "Bacach Shíle Andaí" – 2:33
 "Lá Coimhthíoch fán dTuath (A Strange Day in the Countryside)" – 3:49
 "Crann Úll" – 3:44
 "Gathering Mushrooms" – 2:40
 "An Buinneán Buí" – 4:17
 "Planxty Browne" – 4:13

Personnel

Band
 Ciarán Ó Braonáin – bass, guitar, keyboards, vocals
 Máire Ní Bhraonáin – vocals, harp
 Pól Ó Braonáin – flute, guitar, percussion, vocals
 Noel Ó Dúgáin – guitar, vocals
 Pádraig Ó Dúgáin – guitar, mandolin, vocals

Additional musicians
 Eithne Ní Bhraonáin (Enya) – percussion, keyboards, backing vocals

Production
 Dave Hutchins – recording engineer
 Conny Plank - recording engineer
 Brian Masterson – mixing
 Bill Giolando – mastering
 Nicky Ryan – producer

Notes

External links
 Album sleevenotes
 Record Label Catalogue 2010

1980 albums
Clannad albums